is a district in the city of Nan'yō, Yamagata, Japan. The two kanji characters that form the name "nakagawa" mean "inside" or "medium" (size) and "river".

Nakagawa was the site of a quarry, and today its most Important Cultural Property is the  carved on the south face of Mount Iwabu. These Kannon images were created in the Edo period. The  was built in 1880 on the orders of the first governor of Yamagata Prefecture, and is preserved as an example of efforts to improve communications in the prefecture in its early history.

Education
Nakagawa has one elementary school and had one junior high school. Nakagawa Junior High School was closed in 2008 and merged with Akayu Junior High School.

Transport
Nakagawa is served by National Route 13 and Nakagawa Station, run by JR East.

Nan'yō, Yamagata